Nicholas Werk (fl. 1384–1390), of Lincoln, was an English politician.

Family
Werk married Isabel, who died at some point before June 1397. They had one daughter.

Career
He was a Member (MP) of the Parliament of England for Lincoln in April 1384 and January 1390.

References

14th-century births
Year of death missing
English MPs April 1384
People from Lincoln, England
English MPs January 1390